The SRX are a series of expansion boards produced by Roland Corporation. First introduced in 2000, they are small boards of electronic circuitry with 64MB ROMs containing patches (timbres) and rhythm sets (drum kits). They are used to expand certain models of Roland synthesizers, music workstations, keyboards, and sound modules.

Predecessor formats include the 15 SN-U110 PCM cards (U-110, U-20, U-220, D-70, CM-64 and CM-32P), 8 SL-JD80 PCM card/preset RAM card (JD-only) sets and 8 SO-PCM1 1-2 MB cards (both JD-800, JD-990, JV-80, JV-880, JV-90, JV-1000 and JV-1080), 22 SR-JV80 expansion boards (JD-990, JV-880, JV-1010, JV-1080, JV-2080, XV-3080, XV-5080, JV-80, JV-90, JV-1000, XP-30, XP-50, XP-60, XP-80, Fantom FA76, XV-88) and others.

Expansion boards
 SRX-01 Dynamic Drum Kits
 SRX-02 Concert Piano
 SRX-03 Studio SRX
 SRX-04 Symphonique Strings
 SRX-05 Supreme Dance
 SRX-06 Complete Orchestra
 SRX-07 Ultimate Keys
 SRX-08 Platinum Trax
 SRX-09 World Collection
 SRX-10 Big Brass Ensemble
 SRX-11 Complete Piano
 SRX-12 Classic EPs
 SRX-96 World Collection and Legendary XP Essentials (special SRX board 2008)
 SRX-97 Jon Lord's Rock Organ (special SRX board 2007)
 SRX-98 Analog Essentials (special SRX board 2006)
 SRX-99 Special Wave Expansion (promo released mid-2004)

Compatible hosts
According to Roland, the following products accept SRX expansion boards. The number in parenthesis indicates the number of SRX boards each unit can accept.
 Fantom workstation (2)
 Fantom-S series (4)
 Fantom-X series (4)
 Fantom-XR rack unit (6)
 Juno-G (1)
 Juno-Stage (2)
 RD-700, RD-700SX, and RD-700GX (2)
 V-Combo (2)
 G-70 (1)
 E-80 (2)
 Roland MC-909 (1)
 SonicCell module (2)
 XV-88 (2)
 XV-5050, XV-3080, and XV-2020 modules (2)
 XV-5080 (4)
 V-Studio 700 (1)

Some later SRX cards, for example the SRX96 and 97 do not work in the XV3080 host synthesizer module nor in the XV-88 keyboard synthesizer.

References

External links 
 Roland website
  
 SRX Expansion Board Demo
 SRX Audio Demos - Roland Japan

Music hardware
Roland synthesizers